Si Ayutthaya Road is a road in inner Bangkok. It starting from Ratchaprarop road at Makkasan intersection in the area of Ratchathewi district to eastward where cuts Phaya Thai road, then cuts Rama VI road Kamphaeng Phet 5 road and northern railway line, then into Dusit district through many important places such as Dusit Palace, Wat Benchamabophit, Royal Plaza, Paruskavan Palace, Ministry of Foreign Affairs etc., until the last phase which meeting Samsen road beside to Chao Phraya river bank at Si Sao Thewet intersection.

It was formerly known as Thanon Duang Tawan (ถนนดวงตะวัน; lit Sun Road) can be divided into three parts viz Thanon Duang Tawan Nok (ถนนดวงตะวันนอก; Outer Sun Road), Thanon Duang Tawan Nai (ถนนดวงตะวันใน; Inner Sun Road) and Thanon Duang Na (ถนนดวงตะวันหน้า; Front Sun Road) according to the direction it runs through. The road was built in 1898, during the reign of King Chulalongkorn (Rama V), along with Dusit Palace and the other roads that surround the palace. Its name is derived from a kind of Chinese ceramic with sunrise from the sea motifs, one of the most popular collections in that era.

Later on February 6, 1919, which corresponds to the reign of King Vajiravudh (Rama VI), he changed the name of these roads, including Duang Tawan road. The name "Si Ayutthaya" is a reminder of his former royal title "Krom Khun Thep Dvaravati" (Prince of Dvaravati), that refers to Prince of Ayutthaya Kingdom.

References 

Streets in Bangkok
Ratchathewi district
Dusit district